July 11 - Eastern Orthodox Church calendar - July 13

All fixed commemorations below are celebrated on July 25 by Old Calendar.

For July 12th, Orthodox Churches on the Old Calendar commemorate the Saints listed on June 29.

Saints
 Saint Veronica, the woman with the issue of blood who was healed by the Savior (1st century) 
 Martyr Serapion the New, at Alexandria (194-211)  (see also: July 13)
 Martyrs Proclus and Hilary, of Ancyra (2nd century)
 Martyrs Andrew the Commander, Heraclius, Faustus, Menas, and those with them.  (see also: August 31)
 Great-martyr Mamas, whose synaxis near Sigma we celebrate.
 Martyr Golinduc, in holy baptism Mary, of Persia (591)  (see also: July 13)
 Venerables John (998) and Gabriel (10th century) of Georgia and Iveron, Mt. Athos.
 Venerable Michael Maleinus, spiritual father of Saint Athanasius of Athos (962)
 Martyrs Theodore of Kiev and his son John, the Varangians, at Kiev (983)

Pre-Schism Western saints
 Saint Hermagoras of Aquileia, and his deacon Fortunatus, martyrs under Nero (c.66)
 Saint Paulinus of Antioch, and Companions (c. 67) 
 Saint Marciana, a virgin-martyr venerated in Toledo in Spain (c. 303)
 Saints Nabor and Felix, martyrs in Milan in Italy under Diocletian (c. 304)
 Saint Paternian, Bishop of Bologna in Italy (c. 470)
 Saint Viventiolus, a monk at St Oyend in France who became Archbishop of Lyons (524)
 Saint Proculus, Bishop of Bologna in Italy (540-542), martyred by the Goths (542)
 Saint Menulphus (Menou), born in Ireland, he became Bishop of Quimper in Brittany (7th century)
 Saint Ansbald of Prüm, in Germany (886)

Post-Schism Orthodox saints
 Blessed Serapion of Vladimir, Bishop of Vladimir (1275)
 Saint Arsenius of Novgorod, Fool-for-Christ (1570)
 Monk-martyr Simon (Symeon), founder of Volomsk Monastery, Vologda (1641) 
 Venerable Paisios the Athonite (1994)  (New Style only, Old Style date June 29, see: June 29 )

Other commemorations
 Icon of the Most Holy Theotokos "Of the Three Hands" of Hilandar, Mt. Athos.  (see also: December 4 and June 28 )
 Icon of the Most Holy Theotokos of Prodromos Skete, Mt. Athos, of Voronezh and of Jackson, California (7th century)
 Translation of the relics (1620) of St. Anthony of Leokhnov, founder of Leokhnovo Monastery, Novgorod (1611)
 Translation of the relics (2004) of New Hieromartyr Momcilo Grgurevic of Serbia (1940s) 
 Repose of Hieromonk Daniel (Fomin) of Optina and Sorochinsk (1953)

Icon gallery

Notes

References

Sources
 July 12/July 25. Orthodox Calendar (PRAVOSLAVIE.RU).
 July 25 / July 12. HOLY TRINITY RUSSIAN ORTHODOX CHURCH (A parish of the Patriarchate of Moscow).
 July 12. OCA - The Lives of the Saints.
 July 12. The Year of Our Salvation - Holy Transfiguration Monastery, Brookline, Massachusetts. 
 The Autonomous Orthodox Metropolia of Western Europe and the Americas (ROCOR). St. Hilarion Calendar of Saints for the year of our Lord 2004. St. Hilarion Press (Austin, TX). p. 51.
 The Twelfth Day of the Month of July. Orthodoxy in China.
 July 12. Latin Saints of the Orthodox Patriarchate of Rome.
 The Roman Martyrology. Transl. by the Archbishop of Baltimore. Last Edition, According to the Copy Printed at Rome in 1914. Revised Edition, with the Imprimatur of His Eminence Cardinal Gibbons. Baltimore: John Murphy Company, 1916. pp. 204–205.
 Rev. Richard Stanton. A Menology of England and Wales, or, Brief Memorials of the Ancient British and English Saints Arranged According to the Calendar, Together with the Martyrs of the 16th and 17th Centuries. London: Burns & Oates, 1892. p. 331.
Greek Sources
 Great Synaxaristes:  12 ΙΟΥΛΙΟΥ. ΜΕΓΑΣ ΣΥΝΑΞΑΡΙΣΤΗΣ.
  Συναξαριστής. 12 Ιουλίου. ECCLESIA.GR. (H ΕΚΚΛΗΣΙΑ ΤΗΣ ΕΛΛΑΔΟΣ). 
  12/07/2018. Ορθόδοξος Συναξαριστής. 
Russian Sources
  25 июля (12 июля). Православная Энциклопедия под редакцией Патриарха Московского и всея Руси Кирилла (электронная версия). (Orthodox Encyclopedia - Pravenc.ru).
  12 июля по старому стилю / 25 июля по новому стилю. СПЖ "Союз православных журналистов". 2018.
  12 июля (ст.ст.) 25 июля 2014 (нов. ст.). Русская Православная Церковь Отдел внешних церковных связей. (DECR).

July in the Eastern Orthodox calendar